Pecetto Torinese is a comune (municipality) in the Metropolitan City of Turin in the Italian region Piedmont, located about  southeast of Turin.

Pecetto Torinese borders the following municipalities: Turin, Pino Torinese, Chieri, Moncalieri, Cambiano, and Trofarello. It is renowned for the production of Cherries.

References

Cities and towns in Piedmont